Gossen's Second “Law”, named for Hermann Heinrich Gossen (1810–1858), is the assertion that an economic agent will allocate his or her expenditures such that the ratio of the marginal utility of each good or service to its price (the marginal expenditure necessary for its acquisition) is equal to that for every other good or service.  Formally,

where
  is utility
  is quantity of the -th good or service
  is the price of the -th good or service

Informal derivation 
Imagine that an agent has spent money on various sorts of goods or services.  If the last unit of currency spent on goods or services of one sort bought a quantity with less marginal utility than that which would have been associated with the quantity of another sort that could have been bought with the money, then the agent would have been better off instead buying more of that other good or service.  Assuming that goods and services are continuously divisible, the only way that it is possible that the marginal expenditure on one good or service should not yield more utility than the marginal expenditure on the other (or vice versa) is if the marginal expenditures yield equal utility.

Formal derivation 
Assume that utility, goods, and services have the requisite properties so that  is well defined for each good or service.  An agent then optimizes

subject to a budget constraint

where
  is the total available sum of money
Using the method of Lagrange multipliers, one constructs the function

and finds the first-order conditions for optimization as

(which simply implies that all of  will be spent) and

so that

which is algebraically equivalent to

(Note that, as with any maximization using first-order conditions, the equations will hold only if the utility function satisfies specific concavity requirements and does not have maxima on the edges of the set over which one is maximizing.)

See also 

 Gossen's laws
 Marginal utility
 Marginalism

References 
 Gossen, Hermann Heinrich; Die Entwicklung der Gesetze des menschlichen Verkehrs und der daraus fließenden Regeln für menschliches Handeln (1854).  Translated into English as The Laws of Human Relations and the Rules of Human Action Derived Therefrom (1983) MIT Press, .

Marginal concepts
Utility